The men's doubles tournament at the 1984 Australian Open was held from 26 November through 9 December 1984 on the outdoor grass courts at the Kooyong Stadium in Melbourne, Australia. Mark Edmondson and Sherwood Stewart won the title, defeating Joakim Nyström and Mats Wilander in the final.

Seeds

Draw

Finals

Top half

Section 1

Section 2

Bottom half

Section 3

Section 4

External links
 1984 Australian Open – Men's draws and results at the International Tennis Federation

Men's Doubles
Australian Open (tennis) by year – Men's doubles